The 2017 U Sports Women's Volleyball Championship was held March 17–19, 2017, in Toronto, Ontario, to determine a national champion for the 2016–17 U Sports women's volleyball season. The tournament was played at the Mattamy Athletic Centre and hosted by Ryerson University. It was the first time that Ryerson had hosted the tournament.

The third-seeded UBC Thunderbirds defeated the top-seeded Alberta Pandas in the gold medal match 3–1 to claim their league-leading 11th women's volleyball national championship.

Participating teams

Championship bracket

Consolation bracket

Awards

Championship awards 
 CIS Championship MVP – Danielle Brisebois, UBC
 R.W. Pugh Fair Play Award – Abby Czenze, Dalhousie

All-Star Team 
Danielle Brisebois, UBC
Maggie Li, UBC
Alessandra Gentile, UBC
Meg Casault, Alberta
Kacey Otto, Alberta
Sophie Carpentier, Trinity Western
Marie-Alex Bélanger, Montreal

References

External links 
 Tournament Web Site

U Sports volleyball
2017 in women's volleyball
Toronto Metropolitan University